K20 may refer to:
 K-20 (Kansas highway)
 K-20: Legend of the Mask, a 2008 Japanese film
 K20 Center, an American research institute
 Fairchild K-20, an aerial camera used during World War II
 , an M-class submarine of the Royal Navy
 Kaman K-20, an American helicopter
 Redmi K20, a Chinese smartphone
 K20, a model of Honda K engine